Duane Hawkins (February 17, 1840November 29, 1899) was a Michigan politician.

Early life and education
Duane Hawkins was born on February 17, 1840, in Vermontville, Michigan. His parents, Jay and Lodice Hawkins, moved there from Vermont in 1838. He received a public school education.

Military career
On August 30, 1864, Hawkins enlisted into the Union Army. He served in the 2nd Michigan Volunteer Cavalry Regiment. He was discharged on June 2, 1865.

Career
Hawkins live on a farm for most of his life. On November 2, 1880, Hawkins was elected to the Michigan House of Representatives, where he represented the Eaton County 2nd district from January 5, 1881, to December 31, 1882. Hawkins was elected as a justice of the peace and served as the president of the Eaton County Agricultural Society.

Personal life
Hawkins' first wife, Sarah E. Hallenbeck died on January 10, 1891. In 1892, Hawkins married Gertrude Schroder. Hawkins was a Freemason who served as a Worshipful Master around 1880.

Death
Hawkins died on November 29, 1899, in Vermontville. He was interred at Woodlawn Cemetery in Vermontville.

References

1840 births
1899 deaths
American Freemasons
American justices of the peace
Burials in Michigan
Farmers from Michigan
Republican Party members of the Michigan House of Representatives
People from Eaton County, Michigan
People of Michigan in the American Civil War
Union Army soldiers
19th-century American judges
19th-century American politicians